Sphallotrichus puncticollis is a species of beetle in the family Cerambycidae. It was described by Bates in 1870. It is known from northern central Brazil and French Guiana. It contains the subspecies Sphallotrichus puncticollis puncticollis and Sphallotrichus puncticollis robustus.

References

Cerambycini
Beetles described in 1870